Georgia L Wyllie (born 3 May 2002) is an Australian cricketer who plays as a right-handed batter and left-arm medium bowler for Western Australia in the Women's National Cricket League (WNCL) and Perth Scorchers in the Women's Big Bash League (WBBL).

Domestic career
Wyllie was in the Perth Scorchers squad for the 2020–21 Women's Big Bash League season, but did not play a match. She made her debut for Western Australia on 27 February 2022, against South Australia in the WNCL, scoring 6* and taking 1/32. She went on to play six matches overall for the side that season, with best bowling figures of 2/49. She played three matches for the side in the 2022–23 WNCL, as well as continuing in the Perth Scorchers squad without playing a match.

References

External links

Georgia Wyllie at Cricket Australia

2002 births
Living people
People from Mandurah
Australian women cricketers
Western Australia women cricketers